Olev Laanjärv (born 11 March 1942 in Haapsalu) is an Estonian lawyer and politician.

1990–1992, he was Minister of the Interior.

References

Living people
1942 births
20th-century Estonian lawyers
Communist Party of Estonia politicians
Estonian Centre Party politicians
Ministers of the Interior of Estonia
Members of the Riigikogu, 2003–2007
Tallinn University of Technology alumni
People from Haapsalu